The Russian Soviet Federative Socialist Republic was founded after the October Revolution in the Russian Republic and very soon had to create an award system. The award systems of parallel Soviet states soon followed and they also created and issued awards of their own, mainly in a similar style to the Russian Soviet Federative Socialist Republic. In 1924, the Union Of Soviet Socialist Republics started to award all-union Orders and within a decade all the Orders of member republics had ceased to be awarded. Some Republics such as the Tuvan People's Republic only replaced their own award system with the Soviet Union's after joining and therefore were issued to a later date.

Russian Soviet Federative Socialist Republic

Mountain Autonomous Soviet Socialist Republic

Georgian Soviet Socialist Republic

Armenian Soviet Socialist Republic

Azerbaijan Soviet Socialist Republic

Byelorussian Soviet Socialist Republic

Khorezm People's Soviet Republic

Ukrainian Soviet Socialist Republic

Tajik Autonomous Soviet Socialist Republic

Transcaucasian Socialist Federative Soviet Republic

Tuvan People's Republic

Bukharan People's Soviet Republic

See also
 Orders, decorations, and medals of the Soviet Union
 Socialist orders of merit

Orders, decorations, and medals of the Soviet Union
Soviet republics
Soviet Union-related lists